William J. Corcoran may refer to:
Bill Corcoran, Canadian film and television director
William J. Corcoran (attorney), American attorney and criminal